Sir William Jenkins (8 January 1871 – 8 December 1944) was a British Labour politician and trade union leader.

Jenkins was the son of a coal miner and attended Glyncorrwg National School before taking up work on the railways at the age of 11½. Six years later he became a miner, and later a checkweigher.

He entered politics in 1900 when he was elected to Glyncorrwg School Board, and in 1904 he became a member of the town's urban district council. He was chairman of Glamorgan County Council in 1906 and from 1919 to 1921. He was also chairman of Glyncorrwg UDC from 1908 to 1916. He became secretary of the Western Miners' Association in 1906, and chief agent of the Afan Valley Miners' Federation.

At the 1922 general election he was elected as Labour Member of Parliament (MP) for  Neath, defeating John Hugh Edwards, the sitting Liberal member for the seat by over 8,000 votes. He was elected chairman of the county council for a third time in 1927. He held positions as vice-president of the County Council Association of England and Wales, chairman of the Federation of Education Authorities of Wales, member of the council of the University of Wales and chairman of the Glamorgan School for the Blind. In 1931 he was knighted for his public work.

He continued to hold the Neath seat until his death at Cymmer, Port Talbot in December 1944.

References

1871 births
1944 deaths
Knights Bachelor
Miners' Federation of Great Britain-sponsored MPs
Welsh Labour Party MPs
UK MPs 1922–1923
UK MPs 1923–1924
UK MPs 1924–1929
UK MPs 1929–1931
UK MPs 1931–1935
UK MPs 1935–1945
Members of Glamorgan County Council